Pseudohemiodon devincenzii is a species of armored catfish native to Argentina and Uruguay where it is found in the Uruguay River basin.  This species grows to a length of  SL.

References
 

Loricariini
Fish of South America
Freshwater fish of Argentina
Fish of Uruguay
Fish described in 1950